Circle X (officially untitled) is an EP and the debut release by American experimental rock band Circle X. It was on 12" vinyl in 1980 in France, through then-nascent record label Celluloid.

Background 

CMJ described the album as a "raw, alien, dense set of four tuneless almost-not-even-songs made of spattered guitar, drums and Tony Pinotti's wrecked, howling voice".

Track listing

Critical reception 

Trouser Press opined that the EP was "practically unmatched in its day. [...] Nothing sounded like this in 1979. Circle X caught the tail end of the no wave scene and out-waved it with a mere four ear-splitting compositions."

Re-issues 

Circle X was later re-issued on CD in 1996 through label Dexter's Cigar. It was re-issued on 12" vinyl in Germany in 2009 through label Insolito.

Personnel 

 David Letendre – drums, guitar
 Rik Letendre – guitar, drums
 Tony Pinotti – vocals
 Bruce Witsiepe – guitar

References

External links 

 

1980 EPs
No wave EPs